Edward Espenett Case (born September 27, 1952) is an American lawyer and Democratic politician serving as the U.S. representative for Hawaii's 1st congressional district, which covers the urban core of Honolulu. He represented the 2nd district, which covers the rest of the state, from 2002 to 2007.

A Blue Dog Democrat, Case first came to prominence in Hawaii as majority leader of the Hawaii State Legislature and in his 2002 campaign for governor of Hawaii.

First elected to the House of Representatives in 2002 in a special election to fill the seat of Patsy Mink, who died of pneumonia, Case represented Hawaii's 2nd congressional district until 2006, when he unsuccessfully challenged Daniel Akaka in the Democratic primary for the U.S. Senate.

In 2010, Case was one of two Democratic candidates in the special election for Hawaii's 1st congressional district. With the Democratic vote split, Republican Councilman Charles Djou's 39% of the vote earned him the seat. Case ran again in the Democratic primary for the November general election, but suspended his campaign in May. Colleen Hanabusa, Case's fellow Democrat in the special election, won the primary and the general election against Djou. Case again ran for the Senate in 2012 after Akaka announced his retirement, but lost to Mazie Hirono.

In July 2013, Case announced that he was joining Outrigger Enterprises Group and that his political career was "likely" over. In June 2018, Case announced he would run again in Hawaii's 1st congressional district. He won the crowded Democratic primary election in August and the general election. He took office in January 2019.

Early life, education, and legal career
Case was born in Hilo, the eldest of six children. In 1970, he graduated from Hawaii Preparatory Academy in Kamuela. After high school, Case traveled for a year in Australia, where he worked as a jackaroo on a New South Wales sheep station, and in New Zealand. He then attended Williams College in Williamstown, Massachusetts, where he obtained his bachelor's degree in psychology in 1975.

In 1981, Case graduated from the University of California Hastings College of Law in San Francisco with a Juris Doctor.

From 1981 to 1982, Case served as law clerk to Hawaii Supreme Court Chief Justice William S. Richardson. From 1983 to 2002, he worked at the law firm Carlsmith Ball in Honolulu, where he became a partner in 1989, and served as managing partner from 1992 to 1994, when he was first elected to the Hawaii House of Representatives. Case resigned his partnership upon winning election to the United States Congress in 2002. In 2007 he said he would work for the Honolulu-based law firm of Bays Deaver Lung Rose & Baba.

Early political career
Case got his first taste of political life as a legislative assistant to Congressman and then Senator Spark Matsunaga from 1975 to 1978. In 1985, he won his first election, to the Mānoa Neighborhood Board of Honolulu. He became its chairman in 1987, a position he held until leaving the board in 1989.

Hawaii House of Representatives

Elections
In 1994, Case ran for Hawaii's 23rd House district. He won the Democratic primary with 51% of the vote in a five-candidate field. In the general election, he defeated Green party nominee Toni Worst 59%–41%. In 1996, he was reelected with 67% of the vote. In 1998, he was reelected to a third term with 70% of the vote. In 2000, he was reelected to a fourth term unopposed.

Tenure
Case served four two-year terms in the Hawaii House of Representatives from 1994 to 2002, where he focused on basic change in Hawaii governance. In 1999, after he led an effort to replace the State House leadership, his Democratic peers elected him Majority Leader.

A conservative Democrat by Hawaii standards, Case sought to change the way state government operated and repeatedly warned that Hawaii was not addressing long-term fiscal challenges. On the last legislative day of 2000, he said in a floor speech: "If you cannot make those choices, please get out of the way, because you are just making it harder for the rest of us."

On January 21, 1997, in the House Judiciary Committee, Case cast the lone vote against advancing HB117, which would allow a referendum to effectively constitutionally ban gay marriage. He and six others opposed the bill again in the full House vote. When he was up for reelection in November 1998, he publicly opposed the referendum because, he said, "changing the Constitution would go against its intended purpose—protecting the rights of the minority against the will of the majority." Leading up to the November election, polls consistently predicted that the measure would pass by 70–75%, a prediction that was accurate. Due to the measure's popularity, only three other politicians or candidates in Hawaii joined his position.

In 2001, Case co-sponsored an unsuccessful civil unions bill.

Committee assignments
House Judiciary Committee

2002 gubernatorial election

In early 2001, at the beginning of his fourth term in the Hawaii State House, Case chose not to continue as Majority Leader. In October 2001, he announced his candidacy for governor of Hawaii in 2002. Case's initial opponent was the early favorite in the race, Mayor of Honolulu Jeremy Harris, also a Democrat. Case supporters were discontented with the "Democratic Party of Hawaii machine" that had ruled the state for 40 years and was perceived to have left the economy stagnant, a "machine" to which Harris was closely tied.

Despite high polling numbers, Harris abruptly dropped out of the race in May 2002 because of ongoing campaign spending investigations. Lieutenant Governor Mazie Hirono dropped out of her race for mayor of Honolulu to challenge Case in the primary. A later entrant into the Democratic primary was D. G. "Andy" Anderson, the former Republican state chair and aide to former Honolulu Mayor Frank Fasi. Case told Hawaii voters that his campaign was one of government reform and the future, as opposed to Hirono and Anderson, who represented the "Old Boys' Network" and a status quo past.

In one of the closest primary elections for the Democratic gubernatorial nomination in Hawaii history, Hirono beat Case, 41% to 40%, with Anderson a distant third with 17%. In the general election, Hirono lost to Republican nominee Linda Lingle.

U.S. House of Representatives

Elections

2002

U.S. Representative Patsy Mink died on September 28, 2002, one week after the primary election, leaving her 107th Congress (2001–2003) seat vacant. She was posthumously reelected to the 108th Congress (2003–2005) in November. On November 30, 2002, Case was elected in a special election to serve the remaining two months of Mink's term, gaining over 50% of the vote in a field of over 40, even though he did not live in the district. Members of the House are only constitutionally required to live in the state they represent, though convention calls for them to live in the district they represent. During the special election campaign, Case pointed out that he grew up on the Big Island.

2003

Case ran in a second special election on January 4, 2003, for Mink's 108th Congress seat, facing more than three dozen other candidates. Other Democrats included Matt Matsunaga and Colleen Hanabusa. Republicans included Barbara Marumoto, Bob McDermott, and Frank Fasi. Case won with 43% of the vote.

2004

In 2004, Case defeated Republican challenger Mike Gabbard, a social conservative who focused almost exclusively on gay marriage issues. He won his first full term with 63% of the vote.

2018

In June 2018, Case ran in the crowded Democratic primary, set for August 11. He won with 40% of the vote, defeating six other challengers, including Doug Chin, the incumbent lieutenant governor. In the general election, Case carried Hawaii's 1st congressional district by a 50-point margin, 73.1%—23.1%, defeating Republican Campbell Cavasso.

2020 

He is reelected in 2020 with 72.02% of the vote, defeating Republican Ron Curtis.

Tenure

2002–2007 
Case sponsored 36 bills between 2003 and 2006. Of those bills, Congress passed H.Con.Res.218 recognizing 100 years of Filipino-American immigration to America, the Kaloko-Honokohau National Historical Park Addition Act (H.R.546 / Public Law No. 108-142), legislation (H.R. 2030 / Public Law No: 108-5) designating the U.S. Postal Service facility in Paia, Hawaii, as the Patsy Takemoto Mink Post Office Building, and the Kilauea Point National Wildlife Refuge Expansion Act (H.R. 2619 / Public Law No. 108-481). Two of his other bills were included in subsequent legislation. H.R. 3535, to include country of origin labeling for macadamia nuts, was included in the 2008 Farm Bill. Hirono reintroduced the Kalaupapa Memorial Act (H.R. 4529), which she added to Public Law No. 111-11.

Case entered the House of Representatives too late to cast a vote on the Iraq War Resolution, but supported the Iraq War throughout his tenure in the House. As late as 2006, he opposed a firm timetable for withdrawal.

Case often sided with Republicans on major tax legislation. He was one of only 34 Democrats (who sided with 196 Republicans) to support reducing the estate tax. He also was one of 15 Democrats (who sided with 229 Republicans) to support lower taxes on investment income.

In 2005, Case voted for an amendment by Jeb Hensarling that would eliminate funding for PBS, NPR, and Title X family planning, including money for Planned Parenthood. He was the only Democrat to support the amendment, which failed 102–320.

Case also introduced the Northwestern Hawaiian Islands National Marine Refuge Act (H.R. 2376), which would have protected the Northwestern Hawaiian Islands by making them a national marine refuge. In June 2006, President George W. Bush achieved much of the bill's goals by issuing a public proclamation creating the Papahanaumokuakea Marine National Monument under the authority of the Antiquities Act of 1906.

Case co-sponsored 808 bills during the same period. He missed 148 (6%) of 2435 votes in his tenure.

2019–present 
Case rejoined the Blue Dog Coalition on January 29, 2019.

On July 25, 2019, Case, Don Young, Brad Sherman and Ted Yoho founded the Congressional Pacific Islands Caucus in order to increase Congressional attention to the Indo-Pacific region. The caucus was also formed to encourage greater education for House members on the unique environmental, defense and economic issues of island nations and states in the Pacific Ocean.

On August 27, 2019, Case introduced H.R. 4547, the Safe and Quiet Skies Act. The bill would regulate tour airplane and helicopter flights and, among other things, set decibel limits over residential neighborhoods, prohibit overflights of military facilities, national parks, and residential areas by air tours and require a sterile cockpit. The introduction followed two fatal air tour helicopter crashes in Hawaii that killed 14 people.

On December 18, 2019, Case voted to impeach President Donald Trump.

In August 2021, Case joined a group of conservative Democrats, dubbed "The Unbreakable Nine", who threatened to derail the Biden administration's $3.5 trillion budget reconciliation package meant to tackle the nation's infrastructure.

Committee assignments
2002-2007
 Committee on the Budget
 Committee on Agriculture
 Subcommittee on Livestock (Ranking member, 109th Congress)
 Subcommittee on Conservation, Credit, Rural Development and Research
 Subcommittee on General Farm Commodities and Risk Management
 Committee on Education and the Workforce
 Subcommittee on Education Reform
 Subcommittee on Employer-Employee Relations
 Committee on Small Business
 Subcommittee on Tax, Finance, and Exports
 Subcommittee on Regulatory Reform and Oversight
 Subcommittee on Rural Enterprises, Agriculture and Technology
 Subcommittee on Workforce, Empowerment and Government Programs
2019–present
Committee on Appropriations
Subcommittee on Commerce, Justice, Science and Related Agencies
Subcommittee on Military Construction, Veterans Affairs and Related Agencies
Subcommittee on the Legislative Branch
 Committee on Natural Resources
Subcommittee on National Parks, Forests and Public Lands
Subcommittee on Indigenous Peoples of the United States
Subcommittee on Water, Oceans and Wildlife

Caucus memberships
Case's caucus memberships include:

 Congressional Asian Pacific American Caucus (executive board member)
 New Democrat Coalition
 Blue Dog Coalition

2006 U.S. Senate election

Case challenged Senator Daniel Akaka in the Democratic primary election. He lost the September primary, 53-46%.

Akaka centered his campaign on the difference in support for the U.S. intervention in Iraq. He was one of only a handful of Democratic senators to vote against the use of force resolution against Iraq in 2002; Case, while not in Congress at the time of the vote, had said he would have voted in support of the resolution.

Despite his loss, Case decided to stay in politics.

2010 special congressional election

On March 29, 2009, Case announced his candidacy for Hawaii's 1st congressional district seat, being vacated by Neil Abercrombie. His main opponents were fellow Democrat Colleen Hanabusa and Republican Charles Djou. Case and Hanabusa represented different wings of the party, Case being a conservative Blue Dog Democrat, while Hanabusa was preferred by the progressive wing. Hanabusa was endorsed by EMILY's List, the local party establishment, and local labor unions. Case was at odds with the party establishment over his primary challenge to Akaka in 2006 when he was still Representative of the 2nd district.

Case and Hanabusa each proposed that the other drop out for the sake of party unity. The Democratic Congressional Campaign Committee (DCCC) dispatched an aide to the state in the hopes of at least ensuring no other Democrats enter the race. It was unlikely either Democrat would drop out; they represented different views and had already faced off in a 2002 special election for Hawaii's 2nd congressional district, which Case won. On May 10, 2010, the DCCC said it would not spend any further resources on the race, preferring to save those resources for the November election.

The election was held on May 22, 2010. Djou became the first Republican to win a Hawaii congressional election since 1988. He won with a plurality of 39% of the vote. Hanabusa came in second with 31% and Case came in third with 28% of the vote.

Case initially said he would run in the next primary against Hanabusa, but later changed his mind and dropped out of the race, citing party unity and his third-place finish.

2012 U.S. Senate election

On April 10, 2011, Case announced his candidacy for U.S. Senate, to replace retiring U.S. Senator Daniel Akaka.

In a rematch of the 2002 gubernatorial primary, Hirono once again defeated him, this time by a 17-point margin, 58%–41%.

Papers

The Ed Case Papers were donated to the University of Hawaii at Manoa Library and are held in the Hawaii Congressional Papers Collection of the Library's Archives & Manuscripts Department. The Papers consist of materials from his years in Congress and the Hawaii legislature, as well as campaign material from his successful and unsuccessful campaigns. The papers were processed in 2007 by archivist Ellen Chapman, and will be opened for research on January 3, 2037.

Personal life

Case has two children from his first marriage from 1988 to 1998. In 2001, he married Audrey Nakamura, a former classmate from Hawaii Preparatory Academy, who is a flight attendant with United Airlines. He became reacquainted with her at their 30th class reunion. Nakamura also had two children from a previous marriage.

Case's cousin, Steve Case, is the co-founder of America Online, as well as the former chairman of Time Warner.

Case is Protestant.

References

External links

Congressman Ed Case official U.S. House website
Ed Case for Congress official campaign website
 

|-

|-

|-

|-

1952 births
21st-century American politicians
American Protestants
Christians from Hawaii
Democratic Party members of the United States House of Representatives from Hawaii
Hawaii lawyers
Living people
Democratic Party members of the Hawaii House of Representatives
People from Hilo, Hawaii
Protestants from Hawaii
University of California, Hastings College of the Law alumni
Williams College alumni